Michael Oliveira (born April 24, 1990) is a Brazilian professional boxer.

Professional career
On September 11, 2009 Oliveira beat Robert Kliewer to win the UNBC Latin middleweight title.

On June 2, 2012 Oliveria is scheduled to fight former multiple world champion Acelino Freitas.

End of career

Michael Oliveira was a welcome revelation from Brazilian boxing. Despite the defeat for Acelino "Popó" Freitas, it was seen as the future of Brazil. But on his way Norberto Gonzalez appeared. In 2013, in a duel of 10 rounds, the Brazilian not only knew his second defeat. When losing in the unanimous decision, the "Brazilian Rocky" felt bad and with a clot in the brain spent a few days hospitalized. The episode ended his career.

Professional boxing record 

| style="text-align:center;" colspan="8"|21 Wins (16 knockout, 5 decisions),  2 Losses, 0 Draws
|-  style="text-align:center; background:#e3e3e3;"
|  style="border-style:none none solid solid; "|Res.
|  style="border-style:none none solid solid; "|Record
|  style="border-style:none none solid solid; "|Opponent
|  style="border-style:none none solid solid; "|Type
|  style="border-style:none none solid solid; "|Round
|  style="border-style:none none solid solid; "|Date
|  style="border-style:none none solid solid; "|Location
|  style="border-style:none none solid solid; "|Notes
|- align=center
|Loss||21–2
|align=left| Norberto Gonzalez
|
|
|
|align=left| 
|align=left|
|- align=center
|Win||21–1
|align=left| Francisco Cordero
|
|
|
|align=left| 
|align=left|
|- align=center
|Win||20–1
|align=left| Orlando de Jesus Estrada
|
|
|
|align=left| 
|align=left|
|- align=center
|Win||19–1
|align=left| David Toribio
|
|
|
|align=left| 
|align=left|
|- align=center
|Win||18–1
|align=left| Alexander Hernandez
|
|
|
|align=left| 
|align=left|
|- align=center
|Loss||17–1
|align=left| Acelino Freitas
|
|
|
|align=left| 
|align=left|
|- align=center
|Win||17–0
|align=left| Sergei Melis
|
|
|
|align=left| 
|align=left|
|- align=center
|Win||16–0
|align=left| Xavier Toliver
|
|
|
|align=left| 
|align=left|
|- align=center
|Win||15–0
|align=left| Jose Vidal Soto
|
|
|
|align=left| 
|align=left|
|- align=center
|Win||14–0
|align=left| Abel Nicolas Adriel
|
|
|
|align=left| 
|align=left|
|- align=center
|Win||13–0
|align=left| Junior Ramos
|
|
|
|align=left| 
|align=left|
|- align=center
|Win||12–0
|align=left| Jessie Davis
|
|
|
|align=left| 
|align=left|
|- align=center
|Win||11–0
|align=left| Eduardo Mercedes
|
|
|
|align=left| 
|align=left|
|- align=center
|Win||10–0
|align=left| Gustavo de la Cruz
|
|
|
|align=left| 
|align=left|
|- align=center
|Win||9–0
|align=left| Francisco Ruben Osorio
|
|
|
|align=left|
|align=left|
|- align=center
|Win||8–0
|align=left| Robert Kliewer
|
|
|
|align=left|
|align=left|
|- align=center
|Win||7–0
|align=left| Joe Howard
|
|
|
|align=left|
|align=left|
|- align=center
|Win||6–0
|align=left| Guy Packer
|
|
|
|align=left|
|align=left|
|- align=center
|Win||5–0
|align=left| Vladimir Laguna
|
|
|
|align=left|
|align=left|
|- align=center
|Win||4–0
|align=left| Michael Bradley
|
|
|
|align=left|
|align=left|
|- align=center
|Win||3–0
|align=left| David Deangelo Foster
|
|
|
|align=left|
|align=left|
|- align=center
|Win||2–0
|align=left| Carlos Harris
|
|
|
|align=left|
|align=left|
|- align=center
|Win||1–0
|align=left| Kevin Bartlett
|
|
|
|align=left|
|align=left|

References

External links

Sportspeople from São Paulo
Middleweight boxers
1990 births
Living people
Brazilian male boxers